"The King" is a song written by Prter Kvint and Fredrik Kempe. The song was performed in the second semifinal of Melodifestivalen 2011 by The Playtones in the second semifinal in the town of Linköping. From there, it made it to the finals inside the Stockholm Globe Arena, where it ended up 6th.

The song charted at Svensktoppen for seven weeks. before leaving chart.

In 2011, the song was recorded by the Top Cats for the album Heartache.

Charts

References

2011 singles
2011 songs
Melodifestivalen songs of 2011
The Playtones songs
Songs written by Fredrik Kempe
Songs written by Peter Kvint
Rockabilly songs
Dansband songs